Saada is one of the governorates of Yemen. The governorate's seat and the largest city is Saada. It is the epicentre of Zaydism and where the Houthi group originates from.

Geography
The governorate is 240 kilometers from the capital Sanaa. Northwest of its capital, Saada city, the terrain of the governorate becomes increasingly mountainous and reaches elevations of 2,050 meters in the far west. Between these mountains and Saada city, the terrain is peppered with basins and wadis, ultimately dropping to form arid plains in the east. Rainfall varies greatly according to location. The western mountains of Razih receive as much as 1,000 mm per year, while arid regions east of the governorate's capital can get as little as 50 mm. Given the scarce amounts of arable land in these arid areas, most of the governorate's population lives in the wetter west.

Adjacent governorates

 Al Jawf Governorate (east)
 'Amran Governorate (south)
 Hajjah Governorate (south)

Districts

Saada Governorate is divided into the following 16 districts. These districts are further divided into sub-districts, and then further subdivided into villages:

 Al Dhaher District
 Al Hashwah District
 As Safra District
 Baqim District
 Dammaj District
 Ghamr District
 Haydan District
 Kitaf wa Al Boqe'e District
 Majz District
 Monabbih District
 Qatabir District
 Razih District
 Sa'adah District
 Sahar District
 Saqayn District
 Shada'a District

Cities and towns
 Aba Sa`ud
 Al Buga
 Dhahyan
 Bagim
 Dammaj
 Razeh
 Saada

Climate

Economy
Farming, and trading are the main economic activities in the governorate. Additionally arid land is used for raising livestock. The governorate is also home to Suq al-Talh, the largest weapons market in Yemen.

See also
 'Asir Region, located to the north of the border with Saudi Arabia

References

External links
 IRIN 2007, 'Humanitarian situation in Saada remains poor despite peace agreement', IRIN, 31 July. Retrieved on 27 April 2008.

 
Governorates of Yemen